The 2018–19 DPR Korea Premier Football League was the second season of the reformed DPR Korea Premier Football League, the top North Korean association football league, to use a home-and-away format.The league started on 1 December 2018 and continued until October 2019.

April 25 are the defending champions. The winner, April 25, qualified for the 2020 AFC Cup.

Teams
There was no promotion or relegation from the previous season. A total of 13 teams participate:

League table
Note: The following table is compiled from known results reported in the news media, and may not align with the official table.

Status of remaining 4 games is unknown, they could have been cancelled or played, but not reported.

After the end of the season, official media from DPRK stated that Kigwancha finished second, although according to previously reported results, they could only finish in 4th place (given that they played their last game and won). Also, despite Kyŏnggong'ŏpsong finishing bottom of the table, they remained in the top flight, while the second-to-last Kalmaegi were relegated for unknown reasons.

Awards
2018–19 Awards were given at 23 November 2019
Most Valuable Player : O Hyŏk-chŏl (April 25)
Top scorer : Rim Chŏl-min (April 25)
Best goalkeeper : An Tae-sŏng (April 25)

References

See also
2019 Hwaebul Cup

External links
DPR Korea Football
North Korea 2018/19, RSSSF.com

DPR Korea Football League seasons
1
1
Korea, North